Alfred Léon Lemercier (29 July 1831, in Paris – 15 September 1900, in Nanterre) was a French publisher, editor and lithographer.

Biography 
He was born to a family of lithographers; including his father, Ambroise Lemercier (1807-1889),  and his uncle,  who, in 1828, established a printing company that would become the largest in Paris. He had his first showing, along with other lithographers, at the Salon in 1863. 

Toward the end of the 1870s, he took over management of the printing business, and brought in his son Léon as an associate. He also began employing the new process of Woodburytype.

The following year, he had his last showing at the Salon. 

He also produced posters designed by Jules Chéret, Henri Boutet, Manuel Orazi, and many others. In 1894, he printed over 4,000 posters for the play, Gismonda, designed by Alfons Mucha, and commissioned by Sarah Bernhardt, the play's director at the Théâtre de la Renaissance. Passersby tore most of them off, as souvenirs, leading to a costly lawsuit against the firm. This resulted in the loss of that contract, and several related ones, to other firms. A bankruptcy filing led to the company's closure in 1901; the year following Lemercier's death.

References

Further reading 
 Alfred Lemercier, La Lithographie française de 1796 à 1896 et les arts qui s'y rattachent : manuel pratique s'adressant aux artistes et aux imprimeurs, Lorilleux, 1896 (Online)

External links 

 The Interior of the Lemercier Lithography Firm @ Princeton University, Graphic Arts Collection

1831 births
1900 deaths
French lithographers
Printers from Paris
Publishers (people) from Paris